= Bruce S. Hopping =

Bruce S. Hopping (1921–2018) was an American artist, sports sponsor, and World War II and Korean war veteran. He was included in the International Swimming Hall of Fame and is the founder of the Kalos Kagathos Foundation (originally named the New Jersey Foundation).
